Operation Dropshot  was the United States Department of Defense code name for a contingency plan for a possible nuclear and conventional war with the USSR and its allies in order to counter the anticipated Soviet takeover of Western Europe, the Near East and parts of Eastern Asia expected to begin about 1957. The plan was prepared in 1949 during the early stages of the Cold War and declassified during 1977. Although the scenario included the use of nuclear weapons, they were not expected to play a decisive role. 

At the time, the US nuclear arsenal was limited in size, based mostly in the United States, and depended on bombers for delivery. Dropshot included mission profiles that would have used 300 nuclear bombs and 29,000 high-explosive bombs on 200 targets in 100 cities and towns to wipe out 85 percent of the Soviet Union's industrial potential at a single stroke. Between 75 and 100 of the 300 nuclear weapons were targeted to destroy Soviet combat aircraft on the ground.

The scenario was devised prior to the development of intercontinental ballistic missiles and even included the note that the entire plan would be invalidated if rocketry became a cheap and effective means of delivering nuclear weapons. The documents were later declassified and published as Dropshot: The American Plan for World War III Against Russia in 1957 (Book title).

See also
 United States war plans (1945–1950)
 Plan Totality
 Operation Unthinkable
 Seven Days to the River Rhine
 Basic Encyclopedia

References

External links

 John J. Reilly, "World War III in 1957" via johnreilly.info, archived at Internet Archive, 2006
 George Hulett, "Cold War Warrior", Air Classics, 21 August 2004

Cold War
Nuclear strategy
Soviet Union–United States relations